The 37th Air Division (37th AD) is an inactive United States Air Force organization.  Its last assignment was with Air Defense Command at Goose Air Force Base, Labrador, Canada It was inactivated on 30 June 1970.

History

Strategic Air Command
Established under Strategic Air Command in 1952 as an intermediate-level command and control organization at Lockbourne Air Force Base, Ohio.  Was responsible for strategic reconnaissance operations at Lockbourne and at Lake Charles Air Force Base, Louisiana.  Assigned wings operated Boeing RB-29 Superfortress very long range reconnaissance aircraft.    Both wings deployed operational aircraft to Far East Air Forces in early 1952 for use in Korean War.  Wings re-equipped with new Boeing RB-47 Stratojets.  Inactivated in May 1952.

Air Defense Command

Reactivated on 8 September 1955 by Air Defense Command (ADC) at Truax Field, Wisconsin under Eastern Air Defense Force. Was responsible for the construction and development of several Semi Automatic Ground Environment (SAGE) Data Centers.  SAGE centers developed were at Truax Field, Wisconsin (DC-07) and Combat Center (CC-02); Direction Center (DC-10) at Duluth Municipal Airport, Minnesota; and Direction Center (DC-14) at K.I. Sawyer Air Force Base, Michigan.  Its defense area included parts of Wisconsin, Michigan, Minnesota, Illinois, Indiana, Missouri, Iowa and southern parts of Ontario, Canada as part of the Pinetree Line.

On 8 March 1957, the Chicago Air Defense Sector, along with DC-07 and was assigned to the Division.  On 8 October, the Duluth Air Defense Sector, along with DC-10 was assigned. On 8 November, the Sault Sainte Marie Air Defense Sector was also activated along with DC-14. Inactivated on 1 April 1959 as part of an ADC reorganization, most assets reassigned to the senior ADC 30th Air Division (SAGE).

Reactivated by ADC a second time in April 1966, assuming the assets of inactivating Goose Air Defense Sector at Goose Air Force Base, Labrador, Canada, including the Manual Control Center (MCC) at Goose.  Assumed designation of 37th NORAD Region for stations and allied Canadian Forces assigned to NORAD air defense duties in Canada.

Was responsible for atmospheric defenses (interceptor and radar) for northeastern North America, including Greenland and Air Forces Iceland which was transferred from Military Air Transport Service.

Inactivated June 1970 by ADCOM as part of draw-down of USAF air defense forces in Canada and budget reductions, remaining assets in Canada transferred to Canadian Forces.

Lineage
 Established as the 37 Air Division and organized on 10 October 1951
 Discontinued on 28 May 1952
 Redesignated 37 Air Division (Defense) on 3 May 1955
 Activated on 8 September 1955
 Inactivated on 1 April 1959
 Redesignated 37th Air Division and activated on 20 January 1966 (not organized)
 Organized on 1 April 1966
 Inactivated on 30 June 1970

Assignments
 Second Air Force, 10 October 1951 – 28 May 1952
 Eastern Air Defense Force, 8 September 1955 – 1 April 1959
 Air Defense Command, 20 January 1966 (not organized)
 First Air Force, 1 April 1966
 Aerospace Defense Command, 1 December 1969 – 30 June 1970

Stations
 Lockbourne Air Force Base, Ohio, 10 October 1951 – 28 May 1952
 Truax Field, Wisconsin, 8 September 1955 – 1 April 1959
 Goose Air Force Base, Labrador, Canada, 1 April 1966 – 30 June 1970

Components

Strategic Air Command
 68th Strategic Reconnaissance Wing: 10 October 1951 – 28 May 1952
 Detached for service in Japan (Korean War): 10 October 1951-c. 15 May 1952
 Lake Charles Air Force Base, Louisiana

 91st Strategic Reconnaissance Wing: 10 October 1951 – 28 May 1952
 Detached for service in Japan (Korean War): 10 October 1951 – 17 March 1952
 Lockbourne Air Force Base, Ohio

Air Defense Command

Air Force
 Air Forces Iceland
 Keflavik Airport, Iceland, 1 April 1966 – 31 December 1969

Sectors
 Chicago Air Defense Sector
 Truax Field, Wisconsin, 8 March 1957 – 1 April 1959
 Duluth Air Defense Sector
 Duluth Airport, Minnesota, 1 October-20 December 1957; 1 January-1 April 1959
 Sault Ste Marie Air Defense Sector
 K.I. Sawyer Air Force Base, Michigan, 8 November 1958 – 1 April 1959

Wings
 4706th Air Defense Wing
 )'Hare International Airport, Illinois, 1 March-1 July 1956
 4710th Air Defense Wing
 O'Hare International Airport, Illinois, 1 March-8 July 1956

Groups

 56th Fighter Group (Air Defense)
 O'Hare International Airport, Illinois, 8 July 1956 – 1 April 1959
 327th Fighter Group (Air Defense)
 Truax Field, Wisconsin, 8 July 1956 – 1 April 1959
 343d Fighter Group (Air Defense)
 Duluth Airport, Minnesota, 1 January-1 April 1959
 473d Fighter Group (Air Defense)
 K. I. Sawyer Air Force Base, Michigan, 8 July 1956 – 1 April 1959

 507th Fighter Group (Air Defense)
 Kinross Air Force Base, Michigan, 8 July 1956 – 1 April 1959
 4683d Air Base Group
 Thule Air Base, Greenland, 1 April 1966 – 31 December 1969
 4684th Air Base Group
 Sondrestrom Air Base, Greenland, 1 April 1966 – 31 December 1969

Interceptor squadron
 59th Fighter-Interceptor Squadron
 Goose Air Force Base, Labrador, Canada, 1 April 1966 – 2 January 1967

Radar squadrons

 639th Aircraft Control and Warning Squadron
 Truax Field, Wisconsin, 1 December 1956
 Lowther Air Station, Ontario, Canada, 1 July 1957 – 15 November 1958

 640th Aircraft Control and Warning Squadron
 Stephenville Air Station, Newfoundland, Canada, 1 April 1966 – 31 March 1970

 641st Aircraft Control and Warning Squadron
 Melville Air Station, Labrador, Canada, 1 April 1966 – 31 March 1970

 665th Aircraft Control and Warning Squadron
 Calumet Air Force Station, Michigan, 8 July 1956 – 1 April 1959

 674th Aircraft Control and Warning Squadron
 Osceola Air Force Station, Wisconsin, 1 January-1 April 1959

 676th Aircraft Control and Warning Squadron
 Antigo Air Force Station, Wisconsin, 8 July 1956 – 1 April 1959

 692d Aircraft Control and Warning Squadron
 Baudette Air Force Station, Minnesota, 1 January-1 April 1959

 700th Aircraft Control and Warning Squadron
 Two Creeks Air Force Station, Wisconsin, 8 July 1956 – 30 November 1957

 707th Aircraft Control and Warning Squadron
 Grand Rapids Air Force Station, Minnesota, 1 January-1 April 1959

 752d Aircraft Control and Warning Squadron
 Empire Air Force Station, Michigan, 8 July 1956 – 1 April 1959

 753d Aircraft Control and Warning Squadron
 Sault Sainte Marie Air Force Station, Michigan, 8 July 1956 – 1 April 1959

 755th Aircraft Control and Warning Squadron
 Williams Bay Air Force Station, Wisconsin, 8 July 1956 – 1 April 1959

 756th Aircraft Control and Warning Squadron
 Finland Air Force Station, Minnesota, 1 January-1 April 1959

 782d Aircraft Control and Warning Squadron
 Rockville Air Force Station, Indiana, 1 September 1958 – 1 April 1959

 788th Aircraft Control and Warning Squadron
 Waverly Air Force Station, Iowa, 15 October 1958 – 1 April 1959

 790th Aircraft Control and Warning Squadron
 Kirksville Air Force Station, Missouri, 15 October 1958 – 1 April 1959

 791st Aircraft Control and Warning Squadron
 Custer Air Force Station, Missouri, 15 October 1958 – 1 April 1959

 906th Aircraft Control and Warning Squadron
 Grand Marais Air Force Station, Michigan, 8 July 1956 – 30 November 1957

 913th Aircraft Control and Warning Squadron
 Pagwa Air Station, Ontario, Canada, 8 July 1956 – 1 April 1959

 914th Aircraft Control and Warning Squadron
 Armstrong Air Station, Ontario, Canada, 8 July 1956 – 1 April 1959

 915th Aircraft Control and Warning Squadron
 Sioux Lookout Air Station, Ontario, Canada, 1 January-15 November 1959

 921st Aircraft Control and Warning Squadron
 Saint Anthony Air Station, Newfoundland, Canada, 1 April 1966 – 18 June 1968

 922d Aircraft Control and Warning Squadron
 Cartwright Air Station, Labrador, Canada, 1 April 1966 – 18 June 1968

 923d Aircraft Control and Warning Squadron
 Hopedale Air Station, Labrador, Canada, 1 April 1966 – 18 June 1968

 924th Aircraft Control and Warning Squadron
 Saglek Air Station, Labrador, Canada, 1 April 1966 – 31 March 1970

See also
 List of United States Air Force air divisions
 List of United States Air Force Aerospace Defense Command Interceptor Squadrons
 United States general surveillance radar stations

References

Notes

Bibliography

  
 
 

Military units and formations established in 1952
Military units and formations disestablished in 1970
037
Units and formations of Strategic Air Command
Aerospace Defense Command units